Marie or Mary of Brittany may refer to:

 Marie of Savoy, Baroness of Faucigny (1298-1336), daughter of Amadeus V, Count of Savoy; wife of Hugues de La Tour du Pin, Baron de Faucigny
Marie of Savoy, Duchess of Milan (1411–1469), daughter of Amadeus VIII, Duke of Savoy; wife of Filippo Maria Visconti
Marie of Savoy, Countess of Saint-Pol (1448–1475), daughter of Louis, Duke of Savoy; wife of Louis de Luxembourg, Count of Saint-Pol
 Marie of Savoy, Margravine of Baden-Hochberg (1455-1511), daughter of Amadeus IX, Duke of Savoy; wife of Philip, Margrave of Baden-Hochberg